Robert Steven Genter (born January 4, 1951) is an American former competition swimmer and three-time Olympic medalist.  He was freestyle specialist who earned a gold medal as a member of the winning U.S. team in the 4×200-meter freestyle relay at the 1972 Summer Olympics in Munich, Germany.  He also won silver medals in the 200-meter and 400-meter freestyle events.

In high school, Genter was an All-American in both swimming and water polo.  At the 1972 Olympics, he had a collapsed lung several days before the 200-meter freestyle event.  Doctors advised him to withdraw; he refused, competed, and won a silver medal.  Genter would shave his head before swim meets, for which he was given the nickname "Curly".

See also
 List of Olympic medalists in swimming (men)
 List of University of California, Los Angeles people
 World record progression 4 × 200 metres freestyle relay

References

American male freestyle swimmers
1951 births
Living people
World record setters in swimming
Olympic gold medalists for the United States in swimming
Olympic silver medalists for the United States in swimming
Sportspeople from Los Angeles County, California
Swimmers at the 1971 Pan American Games
Swimmers at the 1972 Summer Olympics
UCLA Bruins men's swimmers
People from Artesia, California
Medalists at the 1972 Summer Olympics
Pan American Games gold medalists for the United States
Pan American Games silver medalists for the United States
Pan American Games medalists in swimming
Universiade medalists in swimming
Universiade silver medalists for the United States
Medalists at the 1970 Summer Universiade
Medalists at the 1971 Pan American Games